Mole Baby is an iOS game for the iPhone and iPad designed by Chinese game company Taomee, which also created Mole Manor, Mole Kart and Mole's World in the same franchise.

Gameplay
The game is a simulation game where the primary objective is to play with and raise the mole baby. The baby gives beans which can be used to buy costumes, fireworks, decorations, and more.

References

External links
 Official site

IOS games
IOS-only games
2012 video games
Video games about animals
Video games about children
Video games developed in China
Virtual pet video games